Semei may be 
Σεμεϊ, the LXX spelling of Shimei
Semei Kakungulu, Ugandan religious leader
Treaty of Semei
Semey, city in Kazakhstan